Kathryn Mead (born 14 February 1977 in Nelson, New Zealand) is a shooting competitor for New Zealand.

At the 2006 Commonwealth Games she won a bronze medal in the 50m Rifle Prone Pairs event with Juliet Etherington.

References

Living people
1977 births
New Zealand female sport shooters
ISSF rifle shooters
Commonwealth Games bronze medallists for New Zealand
Shooters at the 2002 Commonwealth Games
Shooters at the 2006 Commonwealth Games
Sportspeople from Nelson, New Zealand
Commonwealth Games medallists in shooting
Medallists at the 2006 Commonwealth Games